Tinkle is a surname. Notable people with the surname include:

Donald W. Tinkle (1930–1980), herpetologist, ecologist and evolutionary biologist at the University of Michigan
Joslyn Tinkle (born 1990), American basketball player
Lon Tinkle (1906–1980), historian, author, book critic, and professor who specialized in the history of Texas
Tres Tinkle (born 1996), American basketball player
Wayne Tinkle (born 1966), American college basketball coach

See also
Tinkle, Indian magazine
Tinkler (surname)